Caleb Jones (born February 10, 1999) is an American football offensive tackle for the Green Bay Packers of the National Football League (NFL). He played college football at Indiana.

Personal life and high school
Caleb Jones was born on February 10, 1999, in Indianapolis, Indiana to Darice Maxie and James Jones. Jones attended Lawrence North High School, where he played football, track-and-field, and basketball. After his successful tenure in high school, Jones was named an Associated Press all-state offensive lineman for the state of Indiana.

College career
Jones was rated as the twelfth-best player in the state of Indiana going into college and chose to attend Indiana University. Jones redshirted his freshman year and never played a down for Indiana. In his sophomore year, Jones started his first game against FIU and played in eleven games that year. Jones then started the most games in a season he ever would for Indiana, starting twelve games at right tackle and one game at left tackle. With the help of Jones' blocking, Indiana set a school record for the most amount of passing yards in a season. The next year, due to a shortened season caused by the COVID-19 pandemic, Jones only started five games for Indiana. In Jones' senior and final year, he started all twelve games for Indiana at right tackle.

Professional career

After going undrafted in the 2022 NFL Draft, Jones was signed as an undrafted free agent by the Green Bay Packers. Jones did not initially make the Packers' 53-man roster and was signed to the practice squad. However, due to a lack of depth at offensive line during the 2022 NFL season, Jones was signed from the practice squad to the Packers' roster. On October 1, 2022, Jones was placed on the non-football illness list, and later activated on December 14.

References

External links
Green Bay Packers bio
Indiana Hoosiers bio

Living people
Players of American football from Indianapolis
Indiana Hoosiers football players
Green Bay Packers players
1999 births
American football offensive tackles